Genoplesium pedersonii, commonly known as Pederson's midge orchid, is a species of small terrestrial orchid endemic to the Blackdown Tableland in Queensland. It has a single thin leaf fused to the flowering stem and up to thirty small, greenish red to reddish, self-pollinating flowers with a dark purplish red labellum. The species is treated as Corunastylis pedersonii in Queensland.

Description
The flowers are inverted so that the labellum is above the column rather than below it. There is a dark purplish black callus in the centre of the labellum and covering about two-thirds of its surface. Flowering occurs from December to April.

Taxonomy and naming
Genoplesium pedersonii was first formally described in 1991 by David Jones and the description was published in Australian Orchid Research. In 2002, David Jones and Mark Clements changed the name to Corunastylis pedersonii and the species is known by that name in Queensland, but the name is not accepted by the Australian Plant Census. The specific epithet (pedersonii) honours Mr Ted Pederson who discovered this and several other orchid species.

Distribution and habitat
Genoplesium pedersonii grows with sedges and mosses in moist areas on rock ledges on the Blackdown Tableland.

There are unconfirmed records of this species from the Pilliga forest in New South Wales.

References

pedersonii
Endemic orchids of Australia
Orchids of Queensland
Plants described in 1991